Patriarch Nicholas of Alexandria may refer to:

 Patriarch Nicholas I of Alexandria, Greek Patriarch of Alexandria in 1210–1243
 Patriarch Nicholas II of Alexandria, Greek Patriarch of Alexandria in 1263–1276
 Patriarch Nicholas III of Alexandria, Greek Patriarch of Alexandria in 1389–1398
 Patriarch Nicholas IV of Alexandria, Greek Patriarch of Alexandria in 1412–1417
 Patriarch Nicholas V of Alexandria, Greek Patriarch of Alexandria in 1936–1939
 Patriarch Nicholas VI of Alexandria, Greek Orthodox Patriarch of Alexandria in 1968–1986